Rue Saint Louis en l'Île is the fifteenth album by experimental French singer Brigitte Fontaine, released in 2004 on the Virgin Records label. It features a new version of Le Nougat from her French corazon album with Mustapha and Hakim Amokrane of French band Zebda, as well as a duet with Areski Belkacem, Le Voile à l'école. There's also a cover of Édith Piaf, L'Homme à la moto, which was present before on an hommage album to the singer, in the words of Fontaine, "just to show off".

Track listing

Charts

References 

Brigitte Fontaine albums
2004 albums
Virgin Records albums